Putian railway station is a railway station located in Putian, Fujian Province, China, on the Fuzhou-Xiamen railway. The station is operated by the Nanchang Railway Bureau, China Railway Corporation. It opened on 26 April 2010.

The currently under construction Fuzhou–Xiamen high-speed railway will stop here in the future.

References 

Railway stations in Fujian
Railway stations in China opened in 2010